Kleine EWE Arena (English: Small EWE Arena) is a dual indoor sporting arena complex that is located in Oldenburg, Germany. It is a part of the Weser-Ems Halle multi-sporting complex, which contains two main sports arena halls, the small Kleine EWE Arena, and the large Große EWE Arena. The facility's name comes from a sponsorship arrangement with the German energy and telecommunications company .

Kleine EWE arena
The small Kleine EWE arena has a seating capacity of 4,100 for concerts, 3,148 for basketball games, and 2,300 for handball games.

It was regularly used as the home arena of the EWE Baskets Oldenburg professional basketball team for national domestic German League games from 2005 to 2013, and occasionally used by them for their home games after that.

Gallery

References

External links
Official Website Kleine EWE Arena 
Official Website Kleine EWE Arena 

2004 establishments in Germany
Buildings and structures completed in 2005
Indoor arenas in Germany
Basketball venues in Germany
Buildings and structures in Oldenburg (city)
Tourist attractions in Oldenburg (city)
Sports venues in Lower Saxony